These are nominees of the parties participating in the 2013 Philippine House of Representatives party-list election. The parties are ordered by the appearance on the ballot. A voter can vote for only one party, and a party can only win up to three seats. The winning nominees are determined by the order of which they are listed by the party (closed list). The party may submit a list of up to ten nominees; only the first three nominees (the maximum a party is allowed to win at any one time) are listed here.

There are instances where a party submitted two or more lists. In this case, the Commission on Elections shall determine from which amongst the lists would be used to determine which nominees win the allocated seats.

Nominees
1st Consumers Alliance for Rural Energy (1-CARE)
Edgardo Masongsong
Michael Angelo Rivera (incumbent)
Concordio Quisaot
Arts, Business and Science Professionals (ABS)
Catalina Leonen-Pizarro (incumbent)
Michael Angelo Rivera
Concordio Quisaot
Pasang Masda
Roberto Martin
Ferdinand Topacio
Raul Raquid
OFW Family Club (OFW Family)
Roy Señeres, Sr.
Juan Johnny Revilla
Roy Señeres, Jr.
Magdalo para sa Pilipino (Magdalo)
Gary Alejano
Francisco Ashley Acedillo
Manuel Cabochan
Alyansa ng Media at Showbiz (AMS)
Rolando Gonzalo
Leo Martinez
Nick Ferrer
Abono
Conrado Estrella III
Francisco Emmanuel Ortega III (incumbent)
Erika Caitlin Dy
Bayani
Guiling Mamondlong
Homer Bueno
Fitrilyn Dalhani
Advocacy for Teacher Empowerment Through Action, Cooperation and Harmony Towards Educational Reforms (A TEACHER)
Mariano Piamonte, Jr. (incumbent)
Julieta Cortuna (incumbent)
Nenita Habulan
Pilipinos with Disabilities (PWD)
Michael Barredo
Manuel Agcaoili
Adeline Anchieta
Isang Lapian ng Mangingisda at Bayan Tungo sa Kaunlaran (1-LAMBAT)
Reynaldo Soriano
Eurie Rafael Manalo
Eleanor Sanchez
Alliance of Advocates in Mining Advancement for National Progress (AAMA)
Rafael Baniqued, Jr.
Lomino Kaniteng
Michael Jobert Marasigan
Bagong Henerasyon (BH)
Bernadette Herrera-Dy (incumbent)
Katherine Rose Ganyanco
Redentor Tuazon
Sanlakas
Marie Marguerite Lopez
Flora Santos
Jose Aaron Pedrosa, Jr.
Aksyon Magsasaka-Partido Tinig ng Masa (AKMA-PTM)
Michael Kida
Catherine Trinidad
Saldamen Limgas
Ako An Bisaya (AAB)
Disqualified and does not appear on the ballot; its raffled number is skipped.
Kabataan
James Mark Terry Ridon
Asher Allunar
Bai Ali Idayla
Ako Bicol Political Party (AKB)
First list:
Christopher Co (incumbent)
Rodel Batocabe (incumbent)
Alfredo Garbin (incumbent)
Second list:
Emilio Ubaldo, Jr.
Pedro Ravanilla
Rus Kristoffer Parcia
Ang Agrikultura Ating Isulong (AANI)
Joffrey Hapitan
Antonio Gonzales
Jose Policarpio, Jr.
United Movement Against Drug Foundation (UNI-MAD)
Teodoro Lim
Maruja Jadoc
Harry Lorenzo, Jr.
Action League of Indigenous Masses (ALIM)
Don Ferdinand Daquial
Francisco Muñez
Muamar Macaraya
Alay Buhay Community Development Foundation (Alay Buhay)
Weslie Gatchalian (incumbent)
Antonio Sayo
Rodolfo Mallari
An Waray
Neil Benedict Montejo
Jude Acidre
Victoria Isabel Noel
Alagad ng Sining (ASIN)
Disqualified and does not appear on the ballot; its raffled number is skipped.
Puwersa ng Bayaning Atleta (PBA)
Mark Aeron Sambar (incumbent)
Sol Angelie Libanan
ZC Torres
FIRM 24-K Association (FIRM 24-K)
Artemio Lachica
Naomi Licuanan
Rodolfo Santoyo, Jr.
Trade Union Congress Party (TUCP)
First list:
Raymond Democrito Mendoza (incumbent)
Anthony Sasin
Miguel Niez
Second list:
Roland de la Cruz
Alejandro Villaviza
Ternistocles Dejon, Jr.
Ladlad
Bembol Aleeh Benedicto
Danton Remoto
Raymond Paolo Alikpala
Advance Community Development in New Generation (ADING)
Fernando Nicandro
Eufemia Oliva
Herminia Raizama
Abante Retirees Sectoral Party List Organization (Abante Retirees)
Plaridel Abaya
Raul Urgello
Aravela Ramos
1-Abilidad
Puramayer Saquing
Wanda Talosig
Marichu Benavides
Katribu Indigenous Peoples Sectoral Party (Katribu)
Beverly Longid
Genasque Enriquez
Norma Capuyan
Philippine Coconut Producers Federation (COCOFED)
Emerito Calderon
Charles Avila
Alab ng Mamamahayag (ALAM)
Disqualified and does not appear on the ballot; its raffled number is skipped.
Adhikaing Tinataguyod ang Kooperatiba (ATING Koop)
First list:
Roberto Mascariña
Amparo Rimas
Lancelot Padla
Second list:
Isidro Lico (incumbent)
Gloria Futalan
Ma. Socorro Calara
Association of Guard, Utility, Helper, Aider, Rider, Driver/Domestic Helper, Janitor, Agent, and Nanny of the Philippines (GUARDJAN)
Disqualified and does not appear on the ballot; its raffled number is skipped.
Piston Land Transport Coalition (PISTON)
George San Mateo
Edilberto Gonzaga
Edgardo Salarda
Agricultural Sector Alliance of the Philippines (AGAP)
Nicanor Briones (incumbent)
Rico Geron
Arnel Marasigan
Agbiag! Timpuyog Ilocano (Agbiag)
Patricio Antonio (incumbent)
Visitacion Ordoveza
Jose Antonieto Antonio
Association of Laborers and Employees (ALE)
Catalina Bagasina (incumbent)
Ma. Michaela Magtoto
Jane Castro
Abya llonggo
Disqualified and does not appear on the ballot; its raffled number is skipped.
Ang Prolife
James Imbong
Jeremy Benigno Gatdula
Lorna Melegrito
Alliance of Volunteer Educators (AVE)
Eulogio Magsaysay (incumbent)
Jose Baesa
Nicolas Braña
Partido ng mga Magsasaka para sa mga Magsasaka (Binhi)
Ryan Vincent Uy
Pacifico Rico Fajardo, Jr.
Nelson Villanueva
Alliance of Organizations, Networks and Associations of the Philippines (ALONA)
Disqualified and does not appear on the ballot; its raffled number is skipped.
Ating Guro
Benjo Basas
Emilio Abelita III
Armando Aquino
Partido ng Bayan ang Bida (PBB)
Disqualified and does not appear on the ballot; its raffled number is skipped.
Association for Righteousness Advocacy in Leadership (ARAL)
Maria Socorro Malitao
Don Desiderio
Oncenio Lacsamana
Alliance of Concerned Teachers (ACT Teachers)
Antonio Tinio (incumbent)
Francisca Castro
Mae Fe Templa
Butil Farmers Party (Butil)
Agapito Guanlao (incumbent)
Cecilla Leonora Chavez-Custodio
Isidro Santos
Cooperative NATCCO Network Party (Coop NATCCO)
Cresence Paez (incumbent)
Anthony Bravo
Herminio Hernandez
Veterans Freedom Party (VFP)
Estrella Santos
Manuel Pamaran
Joel Joseph Cabides
Anti-Crime and Terrorism Community Involvement and Support (ACT-CIS)
Jerome Oliveros
Manuel Pamaran
Miguel Ortiz
GABRIELA Women's Party (GABRIELA)
Luzviminda Ilagan (incumbent)
Emerenciana de Jesus (incumbent)
Lucia Francisco
1-A Action Moral & Values Recovery Reform Philippines (1-AAMOVER)
Abulkhayer Sambitory
Emmanuel Carancho
Romeo Valorozo
Anak Mindanao
First list:
Amabella Carumba
Acmad Macatimbol
Anthony Cuyong
Second list:
Sitti Djalia Turabin-Hataman
Rowaisa Pandapatan
Alejandro Plariza
Ugnayan Ng Maralita Laban Sa Kahirapan (UMALAB KA)
Maria Angela Esquivel
Arnold Castro
Edgardo Edwin Segaya
Alyansa Ng OFW
Abolcair Guro
Jauhari Usman
Nhazrudin Dianalan
Abakada Guro (Abakada)
Jonathan de la Cruz
Alexander Lopez
Rodolfo Tor
You Against Corruption and Poverty (YACAP)
Artemio Tuquero
Benhur Lopez, Jr.
Shiela Mae Ruelo
Action Brotherhood for Active Dreamers (ABROAD)
Danilo Dy
Michelle Mabag
Diana Rose Delgado
Katipunan ng mga Anak ng Bayan All Filipino Democratic Movement (KAAKBAY)
Leonor Briones
Alain del Rosario
Rene Lopez
Pilipinas para sa Pinoy (PPP)
Disqualified and does not appear on the ballot; its raffled number is skipped.
Aagapay sa Matatanda (AMA)
Ricardo Agapito
Feliciano Rosete
Juan Roldan
Association Of Marine Officer & Ratings (AMOR Seaman)
Christopher Maambong
Victory Alviola
Cresenciano Elaba, Jr.
Ang National Coalition Of Indigenous Peoples Action Na (ANAC-IP)
Jose Panganiban, Jr.
Rizalino Segundo
Nicole Pauline Dy
Angkla: Ang Partido Ng Mga Pilipinong Marino (Angkla)
Jesulito Manalo
Ronaldo Enrile
Juan Miguel Manalo
Atong Paglaum
Rodolfo Pancrudo
Pablo Lorenzo IIII
Melchor Maramara
1-Alliance Advocating Autonomy Party (1-AAAP)
Disqualified and does not appear on the ballot; its raffled number is skipped.
Alyansang Bayanihan ng mga Magsasaka, Manggagawang Bukid at Mangingisda (ABA)
Leonardo Montemayor
Antonio Reyes
Baltazar Sator
Ang Asosasyon sang Mangunguma nga Bisaya-Owa Mangunguma (AAMBIS-OWA)
Sharon Garin (incumbent)
Geraldine Arnaiz
James Garin
Isang Alyansang Aalalay Sa Pinoy Skilled Workers (1-Aalalay)
Darryl Toledo
Michael Mendoza
Reynaldo de Leon
Abante Katutubo (Abante Ka)
Hermenegildo Dumlao
Teodorico Calica
Hazel Gacutan
1 Banat & Ahapo Party-List Coalition (1-BAP)
Silvestre Bello III
Salvador Britanico
Jimmy de Castro
The True Marcos Loyalist For God, Country and People Association of the Philippines (BANTAY)
Maria Evangelina Palparan
Joshua Encabo
Rubylyn Echon
1 Bro-Philippine Guardians Brotherhood (1 BRO-PGBI)
Ronjie Daquigan
George Duldulao
Bernard Rommel Vargas
Alliance For Philippines Security Guards Cooperative (AFPSEGCO)
Sotero Leonoro, Jr.
Ronnie Inacay
Nilo Duka
Agapay ng Indigenous Peoples Rights Alliance (A-IPRA)
Reynaldo Lopez
Ronald Flores
Noel de Luna
Bayan Muna
Neri Colmenares (incumbent)
Carlos Isagani Zarate
Hope Hervilla
Kalikasan Party-list
Disqualified and does not appear on the ballot; its raffled number is skipped.
Mamamayan Tungo sa Maunlad na Pilipinas (MTM Phils)
Renato Uy
Joseph Entero
Datu Abdelnasser Sultan Esmael
Kasangga Sa Kaunlaran (Ang Kasangga)
Gwendolyn Pimentel
Rene Villa, Jr.
Jose Ciceron Lorenzo Haresco
Akbay Kalusugan (AKIN)
Disqualified and does not appear on the ballot; its raffled number is skipped.
LPG Marketers Association (LPGMA)
Arnel Ty (incumbent)
Miguel Ponce, Jr.
Jose Cruz III
Sectoral Party of ang Minero (Ang Minero)
Luis Sarmiento
Horacio Ramos
Patrick Caoile
Kasosyo Producer-Consumer Exchange Association (AA-Kasosyo)
Nasser Pangandaman (incumbent)
Raynor Taroy
Renato Alano
Una ang Pamilya (Ang Pamilya)
Romeo Prestoza
Baltazar Asadon
Reena Concepcion Obillo (incumbent)
1st Kabalikat ng Bayan Ginhawang Sangkatauhan (1st KABAGIS)
Michael Antonio Magsaysay
Paul Vincent Tan
Reynaldo Corsino
1-United Transport Koalisyon (1-UTAK)
Vigor Ma. Mendoza III
Orlando Marquez
Marieto Garvida
Democratic Independent Workers Association (DIWA)
Emmeline Aglipay (incumbent)
Ramon Bergado
Pepito Pico
Alliance for Rural Concerns (ARC)
Alan Paje
Leonardo Odoño
Saudi Sapanta
Citizens' Battle Against Corruption (CIBAC)
First list:
Luis Lokin, Jr.
Bibiano Rivera, Jr.
Antonio Manahan, Jr.
Second list:
Sherwin Tugna (incumbent)
Cinchona Cruz-Gonzales (incumbent)
Armi Jane Borja
Agila ng Katutubong Pilipino (Agila)
Gil Valera
Jocelyn Lebanan
Elorde Valera
1 Guardians Nationalist of the Philippines (1Guardians/GANAP)
Ponciano Mapuyan
Leonardo Lizaso
Edward Baldonado
Alyansa ng mga Grupong Haligi ng Agham at Teknolohiya para sa Mamamayan (AGHAM)
Angelo Palmones (incumbent)
Florentino Tesoro
Ruby Ephraim Rubiano
Migrante Sectoral Party of Overseas Filipinos and Their Families (MIGRANTE)
Concepcion Regalado
Garry Martinez
Emmanuel Villanueva
Anti-War/Anti-Terror Mindanao Peace Movement (AWAT Mindanao(
Jose Agduma II
Christy Joy Arellano
Jose Neodino del Corro
Alyansa Lumad Mindanao (ALLUMAD)
Julius Mabandos
Arthur Alvendia
Evangelisto Morado, Jr.
Abante Tribung Makabansa (ATM)
Allen Capuyan
Reuben Dasay Lingating
Nouh Daiman
Pilipino Association for Country-Urban Poor Youth Advancement and Welfare (PACYAW)
Rene Velarde
Wilfrido Villarama
Antonio Calanoc
Manila Teachers Savings and Loan Association
Disqualified and does not appear on the ballot; its raffled number is skipped.
Association of Local Athletics Entrepreneurs and Hobbyists (ALA EH)
Disqualified and does not appear on the ballot; its raffled number is skipped.
Kababaihang Lingkod Bayan Sa Pilipinas (KLBP)
Maria Carmen Lazaro
Mercidita Calingasan
Thelma Bustonera
Ating Agapay Sentrong Samahan ng mga Obrero (AASENSO)
Teodoro Montoro
Robert Ganzon
Samuel Bumangil
Ang Galing Pinoy (AG)
Eder Dizon
Jerold Dominick David
Ryan Caladiao
Alagad
Diogenes Osabel
Hermenegildo Encierto, Jr.
Renato Navata
Blessed Federation of Farmers and Fishermen International (A Blessed)
Expedito Lorente
Tapa Umali
Jim Garen
Ang Mata'y Alagaan (AMA)
Lorna Velasco
Tricia Nicole Velasco-Catera
Vincent Michael Velasco
Akap Bata Sectoral Organization For Children (Akap Bata)
Arlene Brosas
Edgardo Clemente
Evangeline Castronuevo-Ruga
Social Movement For Active Reform And Transparency (SMART)
Carlito Cubelo
Joseph Cubelo
Marcelino Vergel de Dios
Alliance of Bicolnon Party (ABP)
Enrique Olonan
Neil Vargas
Efren Lumbera
Alliance for Nationalism and Democracy (ANAD)
Pastor Alcover (incumbent)
Baltaire Balangauan
Pedro Leslie Salva
Agrarian Development Association (ADA)
Eric Singson (incumbent representative from Ilocos Sur)
Eric Singson, Jr.
Rodolfo Salanga
Alliance for Rural and Agrarian Reconstruction (ARARO)
Quirino de la Torre
Joel Obar
Jose Gamos
Kaagapay ng Nagkaisang Agilang Pilipinong Magsasaka (KAP)
Jacob Maganduga
Paterno Clapis, Jr.
Liezl Repatacodo
Association of Philippine Electric Cooperatives (APEC)
Rolando Reinoso
Andres Garcia
John Peter Millan
Akbayan Citizens' Action Party (Akbayan)
Walden Bello (incumbent)
Ibarra Gutierrez III
Angelina Ludovice-Katoh
Social Amelioration & Genuine Intervention on Poverty (1-SAGIP)
Erlinda Santiago
Edgardo Madamba
Camilo Bacha
1 Joint Alliance of Marginalized Group (1JAMG)
Homero Mercado
Shiela Marie Fernandez
Julian Eugene Chipeco
Adhikain at Kilusan ng Ordinaryong Tao para sa Lupa, Pabahay, Hanapbuhay at Kaunlaran (AKO BUHAY)
Miles Roces
Percival Chavez
Jose Conrado Barker Sabio
Adhikain ng mga Dakilang Anak Maharlika (ADAM)
Al Makram Arbison
Kadirie Sahali
Abdulbasar Abdula
Ako Ayoko sa Bawal na Droga (AKO)
Ma. Corazon Sarmiento
Rodolfo Caisip
Francis Rico Javier
Abante Mindanao (ABAMIN)
Maximo Rodriguez, Jr. (incumbent)
Virginia Sering
Irenetta Montinola
Append
Pablo Nava III
Eduardo Jimenez
Raineer Chu
Agri-Agra na Reforma para sa Magsasaka ng Pilipinas Movement (AGRI)
Michael Ryan Enriquez
Janice Cruz
Mindalisa Takeuchi
Aangat Tayo
Daryl Grace Abayon (incumbent)
Teddie Elson Rivera
Patricia Mae Veloso
Ang Nars
Leah Primitiva Samaco-Paquiz
Lydia Palaypay
Chris Sorongon
Green Force for the Environment Sons and Daughters of Mother Earth (Green Force)
Ramon Ignacio
Nino Ignacio
Freddie Feir
Coalition of Association of Senior Citizens in the Philippines (Senior Citizens)
First list:
Francisco Datol, Jr.
Amelia Olegario
Efren Santos
Second list:
Godofredo Arquiza (incumbent)
Milagros Magsaysay
David Kho (incumbent)
Ang Laban ng Indiginong Filipino (ALIF)
Abdul Tomawis
Agakhan Tomawis
Raima Cali
Kalinga-Advocacy for Social Empowerment And Nation-Building Through Easing Poverty (Kalinga)
Abigail Faye Ferriol (incumbent)
Irene Gay Saulog
Uzziel Caponpon
Anakpawis
Fernando Hicap
Joel Maglunsod
Randall Echanis
Isang Pangarap ng Bahay sa Bagong Buhay ng Maralitang Kababayan (1-PABAHAY)
Nereo Joaquin, Jr.
Juveley Panganiban
Kenway Tan
Kapatiran ng mga Nakulong na Walang Sala (KAKUSA)
Ma. Jesusa Sespeñe
Romeo Jalosjos
Cipriano Robielos III
Buhay Hayaan Yumabong (BUHAY)
Mariano Michael Velarde, Jr. (incumbent)
Lito Atienza
William Irwin Tieng (incumbent)
Abang Lingkod
Joseph Stephen Paduano
Patrick Leonard Lacson
William Saratobias

References

2013 Philippine general election